Stanisław Leon Kulczyński (9 May 1895 – 12 July 1975) was a Polish botanist and politician.

Son of Władysław Kulczyński the zoologist. Professor of Lwów University (in the Second Polish Republic, its rector from  1936). He resigned his position at the university in 1938 in protest of the institution of ghetto benches, writing to the Minister of Education that "if one destroys a power plant, it is dark at once, but if one destroys the Universities, it is dark fifty years hence." Member of the Polish Secret State, he took part in underground education in Poland during World War II. After the war, when Lwów was annexed by the Soviet Union, he moved to "Regained Territories" (Wrocław), where he became active in the Wrocław University and Wrocław Politechnic. He joined the Stronnictwo Demokratyczne party, was elected to Sejm and was a member of several governmental commissions. Stanislaw Kulczynski was deputy chairman of the Polish Council of State 1956–1969 and as such one of four acting chairmen of the Chairmen of the Council of State (head of state) from 7 to 12 August 1964.

Honours and awards
Kulczyński was awarded the Order of the Builders of People's Poland (1964), the Order of the Banner of Labour 1st class, and the Grand Cross of the Order of Polonia Restituta. In 1963, the University of Wroclaw, Wroclaw University of Technology awarded him an honorary doctorate in 1965.

References

1895 births
1975 deaths
Politicians from Kraków
People from the Kingdom of Galicia and Lodomeria
Alliance of Democrats (Poland) politicians
Members of the State National Council
Members of the Polish Sejm 1947–1952
Members of the Polish Sejm 1952–1956
Members of the Polish Sejm 1957–1961
Members of the Polish Sejm 1961–1965
Members of the Polish Sejm 1965–1969
Members of the Polish Sejm 1969–1972
20th-century Polish botanists
University of Lviv rectors
Academic staff of the University of Wrocław
Grand Crosses of the Order of Polonia Restituta
Commanders of the Order of Polonia Restituta
Officers of the Order of Polonia Restituta
Recipients of the Order of the Builders of People's Poland
Recipients of the Order of the Banner of Work